El extraño viaje is a 1964 Spanish black drama film directed by Fernando Fernán Gómez.

Film director Jess Franco acts as the brother of the protagonist. The film was a huge flop on its  limited release. It was voted seventh best Spanish film by professionals and critics in 1996 Spanish cinema centenary.

Plot summary
In a large house in the middle of a little Spanish town live Venancio and Paquita, the childlike brother and sister of Ignacia, who bullies them continuously. Suspecting that she has a visitor after dark, they start snooping and one night she turns on them in fury. As she is throttling Paquita, Venancio brains her with a bottle and the two hide the body. After leaving town in the dark by taxi, they are then found dead on a beach.

The house is put up for sale and the owner of the bar next door has to empty the vats where he was storing his wine. When at the bottom of one is found the corpse of Ignacia, her secret lover Fernando admits all to the examining magistrate. He was a member of the band that played in the bar in the evenings and used to slip into Ignacia's house after work. When he found her dead, he helped Venancio and Paquita dispose of the body. Then he took them away to the sea, where he gave them knockout drops so that he could escape with Ignacia's money. Unfortunately, his dose was too powerful.

Cast
Carlos Larrañaga — Fernando
Tota Alba — Ignacia Vidal
Lina Canalejas — Beatriz
Sara Lezana — Angelines
Rafaela Aparicio — Paquita Vidal
Jesus Franco — Venancio Vidal
Luis Marín	— Músico
María Luisa Ponte — Mercera

External links
 

1964 films
1960s Spanish-language films
1964 comedy-drama films
Spanish black comedy films
Spanish black-and-white films
Spain in fiction
Films directed by Fernando Fernán Gómez
1960s Spanish films